The 2015 Laurence Olivier Awards were held on Sunday 12 April 2015 at the Royal Opera House, London. The ceremony was hosted by Lenny Henry. A highlights show was shown on ITV shortly after the live event ended.

Gallery

Eligibility 
Any new production that opened between 26 February 2014 and 25 February 2015 in a theatre represented in membership of the Society of London Theatre was eligible for consideration, provided it had performed at least 30 performances.

Event calendar
17 February: Voting opens for the Audience Award for Most Popular Show's first round (by the general public)
26 February: Kevin Spacey is announced as a recipient of the Special Award
5 March: Voting closes for the Audience Award's first round
9 March: Nominations announced by Lesley Manville and James McAvoy (Audience Award round two voting opens to the general public)
18 March: Sylvie Guillem is announced as a recipient of the Special Award
10 April: Voting closes for the Audience Award's final round
12 April: Award ceremony held

Winners and nominees
The nominations were announced on 9 March 2015 in 28 categories.

Productions with multiple nominations and awards
The following 18 productions, including one opera, received multiple nominations:

 9: Memphis
 8: Beautiful
 7: A View from the Bridge
 6: King Charles III
 5: City of Angels, Sunny Afternoon, Wolf Hall and Bring up the Bodies
 4: The Nether
 3: Here Lies Love, Taken at Midnight
 2: A Streetcar Named Desire, Cats, Dirty Rotten Scoundrels, Made in Dagenham, Miss Saigon, The Crucible, The Mastersingers of Nuremberg, Women on the Verge of a Nervous Breakdown

The following seven productions, including one opera, received multiple awards:

 4: Sunny Afternoon
 3: A View from the Bridge
 2: Beautiful, City of Angels, Memphis, The Mastersingers of Nuremberg, Wolf Hall and Bring up the Bodies

See also 
 69th Tony Awards

References

External links
 Olivier Awards official website

Laurence Olivier Awards ceremonies
Laurence Olivier
Laurence Olivier Awards
Laurence Olivier Awards
Laurence Olivier Awards
Royal Opera House